Mushrooming is a 2012 Estonian comedy film directed by Toomas Hussar. The film was selected as the Estonian entry for the Best Foreign Language Oscar at the 85th Academy Awards, but it did not make the final shortlist.

Cast
 Hendrik Toompere Jr. Jr. as Villu Koobalt
 Hilje Murel as Silvi Säinas
 Elina Reinold as Viivi Kägu
 Üllar Saaremäe as Local redneck
 Raivo E. Tamm as Aadu Kägu
 Juhan Ulfsak as Zäk
 Ott Sepp as Sibi
 Volli Käro as Karl
 Ülle Kaljuste as Meikar

See also
 List of submissions to the 85th Academy Awards for Best Foreign Language Film
 List of Estonian submissions for the Academy Award for Best Foreign Language Film

References

External links
 

2012 films
2012 comedy films
Estonian-language films
Estonian comedy films